The Ras Kigomasha Lighthouse is located at the north western tip of Pemba, in Tanzania. It is an entirely cast iron structure and was built in 1904 by The Chance Brothers Ltd from Birmingham. The light house has a 1-storey keepers house and is still operational.

Gallery

See also
 List of lighthouses in Tanzania

References

External links 

 Tanzania Ports Authority

Lighthouses in Tanzania
Pemba Island
Lighthouses completed in 1904